Gauriphanta is a village in  on the bank of River Mohana in Northe of Lakhimpur Kheri district in the Indian state of Uttar Pradesh, located on the border with Nepal across from the city Dhangadhi.

Transport
Gauriphanta is on State Highway No. 70. It was also a terminal railway station on the Mailani-Dudhwa-Gauriphanta line.  Nepalese and Indian nationals may cross the border without restrictions, however there is a customs checkpoint for goods and third country nationals.

See also
Dudhwa National Park

References

Villages in Lakhimpur Kheri district
Transit and customs posts along the India–Nepal border